David Tamura is a Japanese-American New York City-based multi-instrumentalist. He was a member of Von LMO's band on the album Red Resistor, which was described as "brilliantly tight". He has played with many musicians on the New York noise rock scene. He is one of the main forces behind The Jazzfakers, where he plays guitar, keyboards, and saxophone; one reviewer writes "it’s him that provides the powdery, blues-rich tenor melody that boards the loose-boned march of Oh Rise New, adding a recognizable jazz voice to the restless buzz-keyboard swirls and mosquito-drill guitar, the rambling bass tune and the childlike organ which hangs and fidgets on a single disruptive chord".

Partial discography
 Ron Anderson / Robert L. Pepper* / David Tamura / Philippe Petit – Closed Encounters Of The 4 Minds
 Scott Rifkin's Music for the Free World (feat. David Tamura, Yuko Pepe & Sky Hall)
 Von LMO - Red Resistor
 The Jazzfakers - Here Is Now
 The Chonto/Tamura Sonic Insurgency w/ Kidd Jordan
The Conto/Tamura Sonic Insurgency w/ Sabir Mateen
 Dave Burrells Conception - (featuring Dave Burrell, Joe Chonto, David Tamura)
 The JazzFakers - Hallucinations

References

Living people
Japanese-American instrumentalists
Year of birth missing (living people)